Siegfried Gutenbrunner (26 May 1906 – 23 November 1984) was an Austrian philologist who specialized in Germanic studies.

Biography
Siegfried Gutenbrunner was born in Vienna, Austria on 26 May 1906. He gained his PhD in Germanistics at the University of Vienna in 1931.

After gaining his habilitation at Vienna, Gutenbrunner served there as Privatdozent (1936–1939) and Docent (1939–1943). Since 1943, Gutenbrunner was associate professor of Germanic and Scandinavian studies at the Reichsuniversität Straßburg.

After the end of World War II, held a chair at the University of Kiel. Since 1950, Gutenbrunner served as associate professor (1950–1955) and professor (1955–1975) of Germanic and Nordic philology at the University of Freiburg. At Freiburg, Gutenbrunner founded the Seminar for Scandinavian Studies in 1963.

Gutenbrunner retired as professor emeritus in 1975, and died in Freiburg on 23 November 1984.

See also
 Otto Höfler
 Richard Wolfram
 Walter Steinhauser

Selected works
 Die Germanischen Götternamen der Antiken Inschriften, 1936
 Germanische Frühzeit in den Berichten der Antike, 1939
 Schleswig-Holsteins älteste Literatur, von der Kimbernzeit bis zur Gudrundichtung, 1949
 Historische Laut- und Formenlehre des Altisländischen, 1951
 Von Hildebrand und Hadubrand, 1976

Sources

 Elias H. Füllenbach, Gutenbrunner, Siegfried, in: Internationales Germanistenlexikon 1800–1950. Band 1: A–G., hrsg. von Christoph König unter Mitarbeit von Birgit Wägenbaur de Gruyter, Berlin/New York 2003, S. 640–642.

1906 births
1984 deaths
Austrian non-fiction writers
Austrian philologists
Germanists
Germanic studies scholars
Old Norse studies scholars
Scandinavian studies scholars
University of Vienna alumni
Academic staff of the University of Freiburg
Academic staff of the University of Kiel
Academic staff of the University of Vienna
Writers on Germanic paganism
20th-century philologists